John Ivan Tiner CBE (born 25 February 1957) is a British manager in the world of finance and financial regulation. He was chief executive of the Financial Services Authority (FSA) from September 2003 to July 2007. He is now Chief Executive of Resolution Limited.

Early life
He was born in Guildford, Surrey. He was educated at Kingston University.

Career 
For 25 years up to April 2001, he worked for Arthur Andersen (a firm of accountants and management consultants). He was a partner for 13 years, and in 1997 became head of the global financial services practice. He led a team that produced a report into the 1995 collapse of Barings Bank for the Bank of England's Board of Banking Supervision. This led him to be increasingly interested in financial regulation.

In April 2001, he joined the FSA to become managing director of consumer, investment and insurance directorate. In September 2003, he became FSA chief executive. This came after the resignation of Sir Howard Davies as FSA executive chairman, when that post was split into two: chairman (Sir Callum McCarthy) and chief executive (Tiner). At the FSA, he led the Tiner Review into the insurance industry, dealt with the split capital investment trusts scandal, addressed the issue of consumers' poor understanding of personal finance, and reorganized the FSA into three business units: retail markets, wholesale markets and regulatory services. He also promoted principles-based regulation as against rules-based regulation. He resigned from the FSA in July 2007, and was succeeded as chief executive by Hector Sants.

In April 2008, he took up a non-executive directorship at New Star Asset Management (now Henderson New Star). In September 2008, he became chief executive of Resolution Operations LLP (the operational counterpart of Resolution Limited, a Guernsey-based company with aspirations to consolidate the UK insurance industry). Since 2009, he has been a member of the board and audit committee of Credit Suisse Group AG; his term as board member expires at the AGM in 2012.

Tiner will be leaving Resolution and will be replaced by Andy Briggs, currently chief executive of Friends Life.

References 

1957 births
British chief executives
British corporate directors
British accountants
English financial businesspeople
Living people
Commanders of the Order of the British Empire
People from Guildford
Alumni of Kingston University